The 69111/69112 Surat–Vadodara MEMU is a MEMU train of the Indian Railways connecting  and  of Gujarat. It is currently being operated with 69111/69112 train numbers on a daily basis.

Service

69111/Surat–Vadodara MEMU has average speed of 42 km/hr and covers 130 km in 3 hrs 5 min.
69112/Vadodara–Surat MEMU has average speed of 41 km/hr and covers 130 km in 3 hrs 10 min.

Route 

Coach composition

The train consists of 20 MEMU rake coaches.

Rake sharing

The train shares its rake with 69153/69154 Umargam Road–Valsad MEMU and 69151/69152 Valsad–Surat MEMU.

External links 

 69111/Surat–Vadodara MEMU India Rail Info
 69112/Vadodara–Surat MEMU India Rail Info

References 

Transport in Vadodara
Transport in Surat
Electric multiple units in Gujarat